In the 1965 Virginia gubernatorial election, incumbent Governor Albertis Harrison, a Democrat, was unable to seek re-election due to term limits. Linwood Holton, an attorney from Roanoke, was nominated by the Republican Party to run against Democratic Lieutenant Governor of Virginia Mills Godwin.

George Lincoln Rockwell, an avowed White Supremacist and founder/leader of the American Nazi Party, ran as an independent candidate.

Candidates
Mills E. Godwin, Jr., Lieutenant Governor of Virginia (D)
A. Linwood Holton, Jr., attorney from Roanoke (R)
William J. Story, Jr., assistant superintendent of Chesapeake City Public Schools (C)
George Lincoln Rockwell, Independent

Results

Godwin won the election with a plurality over Holton and Story. Story's strength mainly came at the expense of the Democrats as counties that had been won by Democrats with 60-70% shrank to 40-50% in Eastern Virginia. Story ran best in the Piedmont region of the state, while Holton ran best near the Appalachian counties in the state.

References

Gubernatorial
1965
Virginia
November 1965 events in the United States